The Rivière au Doré is a tributary of rivière aux Saumons, flowing in the municipalities of La Doré and the town of Saint-Félicien, in the Le Domaine-du-Roy Regional County Municipality, in the administrative region of Saguenay–Lac-Saint-Jean, in the province of Quebec, in Canada.

The Doré river valley is mainly served by the chemin du rang Saint-Eugène (route 167).

Forestry (mainly forestry) is the main economic activity in the upper part of this valley; agriculture, in the middle and lower part.

Geography 
The Doré river draws its source at the mouth of a small lake (length:  of triangular shape;) in forest area in the municipality from La Doré. This source is located at:
  east of the course of the Pémonca River;
  north-west of the village center of La Doré;
  northwest of downtown Saint-Félicien;
  north-west of the mouth of the Doré river.

  first on  towards the northeast to a bend in the river, then towards the southeast by collecting the discharge (coming from the south west) of a lake, crossing Lac des Hôtes (length: ; altitude: , to the north shore of lac Ouitouche Nord;
  south-east across Lake Ouitouche North over its full length to its mouth. Note: Lac Ouitouche Nord is fed by the outlet (from the west) of four lakes. Lake Ouitouche Nord has a large peninsula attached to the southwest shore;
  towards the east by cutting the istm connecting lakes Ouitouche North and Ouitouche South, crossing Lake Ouitouche South, to its mouth. Note: Lac Ouitouche Sud is mainly fed by the discharge (coming from the south) of a lake and the discharge (coming from the southwest) of some small lakes including Lac Rond;
  to the east relatively in a straight line, in agricultural area, collecting a stream (coming from the north) and collecting the discharge (coming from the west) of some lakes including Lac Lamarre, to chemin du Rang Saint-Eugène (route 167);
Note: This segment of river drains a large area of marsh (length:  with nine streams, passing on the southwest side of this marsh;
  towards the east by forming a loop towards the north by collecting a stream (coming from the northwest) in court, to its mouth.

The Rivière au Doré flows on the north bank of the Rivière aux Saumons, facing a small island and upstream from rapids around another island in the Rivière aux Saumons. This confluence is located at:

  west of downtown Saint-Félicien;
  north-west of the mouth of the Ashuapmushuan river;
  northwest of downtown Roberval.

Toponymy 
The term "Golden" refers to a species of fish.

The toponym “Rivière au Doré” was formalized on December 5, 1968, at the Place Names Bank of the Commission de toponymie du Québec.

See also 

 List of rivers of Quebec

Notes and references 

Rivers of Saguenay–Lac-Saint-Jean
Le Domaine-du-Roy Regional County Municipality